Didier Lavergne is a French make-up artist. He won an Academy Award for Best Makeup as well as a BAFTA Award for Best Makeup for his work in La Vie en rose (2007).

References

External links

French make-up artists
Best Makeup Academy Award winners
Best Makeup BAFTA Award winners
Year of birth missing (living people)
Living people